This list of museums in Pennsylvania encompasses museums defined for this context as institutions (including nonprofit organizations, government entities, and private businesses) that collect and care for objects of cultural, artistic, scientific, or historical interest and make their collections or related exhibits available for public viewing. Also included are university and non-profit art galleries. Museums that exist only in cyberspace (i.e., virtual museums) are not included.

Current museums

Defunct museums
 American Civil War Wax Museum, Gettysburg, collections now at the Gettysburg Heritage Center
 American Museum of Veterinary Medicine, Birdsboro, closed in 2010, collections donated to the University of Wisconsin School of Veterinary Medicine
 Americana Museum of Bird-in-Hand, Bird-in-Hand, closed in 206, small town America at the dawn of the 20th century, included a barber shop, woodworking shop, tea parlor, print shop, millinery, toy store, blacksmith shop, tobacco shop, apothecary, wheelwright shop, and a country general store
 Baker-Dungan Museum, Beaver
 Easton Museum of Pez Dispensers, Easton,
 Eddie's Toy Museum & Store, Monroe
 George Westinghouse Museum, Wilmerding, closed in 2007, collection now part of the Heinz History Center
 Hall of Presidents Exhibit, Gettysburg, closed in 2016, contents auctioned
 Hazel Kibler Memorial Museum, Girard, operated by the West County Historical Association
 Heritage Center Museum, Lancaster, closed in 2011 
 JEM Classic Car Museum, Andreas, collection sold in 2003
 Jewish Museum of Eastern Pennsylvania, Pottsville, closed in 2014
 Kready's Country Store Museum, Lititz
 Lancaster County Quilts and Textile Museum, closed in 2011 
 Marx Toy Museum, Erie, closed April 2008, now online only
 Mary Stolz Doll Museum, Bushkill, closed in 2005
 Mary Merritt Doll and Early Childhood Museum, Douglassville, closed in December 2005.
 Museum of Erie GE History, Erie
 National Philatelic Museum, Philadelphia, opened in 1948, closed in 1959
 Old Mauch Chunk Model Train Display, Jim Thorpe, closed in 2012 
 Pennsylvania Fishing Museum at Pecks Pond, Dingmans Ferry
 People's Place Quilt Museum, Intercourse, closed in 2013
 Round Top Museum, Gettysburg, collections now part of the Gettysburg Heritage Center
 Soldiers National Museum, Gettysburg, closed in 2014 and contents auctioned
 Sones Farm & Home Museum, Muncy, closed in 2017
 Toy Robot Museum, Adamstown
 Windber Coal Heritage Center, Windber, operated by the Eureka Coal Heritage Foundation, closed in 2014

See also
Nature Centers in Pennsylvania

Resources
 Pennsylvania Historical and Museum Commission
 Pennsylvania Federation of Museums and Historical Organizations

References

Pennsylvania

Museums
Museums